The Circustheater (AFAS Circustheater) is a musical theatre in The Hague, owned and operated by Stage Entertainment.

History 
The theatre dates back to 1904, when it was designed by Wilhelmus Barnardus van Liefland and was built to house Circus Schumann during the summer season. When the publics interest in the circus declined, the theatre was transformed in 1964 to a regular theater to house concerts among others. Over the following decades the theatre started to deteriorate. Joop van den Ende, Stardust B.V. and Xelat Recrea B.V. acquired the theatre from the municipality of The Hague for the symbolic amount of ƒ 1,-. The consortium invested ƒ 25 million and transformed the site into the first open-end musical theatre of The Netherlands, the new theatre was designed by architect Meijs. The theatre is currently owned and operated by Stage Entertainment, the international live-entertainment company founded by Joop van den Ende.

Sponsorship
The theatre has had a sponsor since the re-opening in 1991. This started with VSB from 1991 till 2004, when VSB merged with Fortis changing the name into Fortis Circustheater. When the bank went under during the financial crisis the sponsorship stopped in 2010. In 2011 a new sponsor was found in AFAS, resulting in the current name of the complex.

Productions

Trivia

 In honour of its 100-year anniversary, Madurodam unveiled a replica of the building on October 5, 2004.

External links
 AFAS Circustheater
 Stage Entertainment Corporate

References

Theatres in the Netherlands
Musical theatre organizations
Musical Theatre articles needing attention